Subhalagnam is a 1994 Indian Telugu-language film co-written, directed, and scored by S. V. Krishna Reddy. It stars Jagapathi Babu, Aamani, and Roja. The film was produced by K. Venkateswara Rao under the Sri Priyanka Pictures banner and presented by C. Aswani Dutt. The plot follows a greedy woman who makes a financial deal to let another woman marry her husband.

Released on 30 September 1994, the film received three Nandi Awards, inducing the Best Feature Film in addition to two Filmfare Awards. The film was remade in Tamil as Irattai Roja (1996), in Hindi as Judaai (1997), in Kannada as Ganga Yamuna (1997), and in Malayalam as Sundara Purushan (2001).

Plot
The film begins with an engineer Madhu marrying Radha, a lavish woman who imagines a separate riches world. Madhu is a candid simple middle-class guy which vexes Radha and she always badgers Madhu to fulfill her dreams. After 7 years, the couple is blessed with two children but so far Radha’s sumptuous mindset doesn’t change. Meanwhile. Madhu’s Boss's daughter Latha returns from abroad. Once Madhu rescues her from the danger and she falls for him. Despite learning Madhu is a spousal, she is adamant about marrying him. So, Latha acquainted with Radha offers 1 crore in the swap of Madhu. Then, covetous Radha accepts it and compels Madhu. Wherefore, he nuptials Latha divorcing Radha and all of them set under one roof.

Now Radha molds herself as a socialite and neglects the family. However, Madhu is inflexible following his bourgeoisie lifestyle and Latha moves in his footsteps. Initially, Madhu detests and backs off her. But Latha brings forth her space in the hearts of Madhu & children by showering love and affection. After some time, Radha realizes how far she is drifted and tries to amend but fails. Currently, she feels Latha is purloining her family. Herewith, Radha offers all her wealth back to retrieve Madhu when wrangles arise. So, she also proceeds for legal advice which also proclaims Madhu as Latha’s husband. Then, Radha tries to neck out Latha when Madhu too accompanies her along with the children. The next, distraught Radha donates her property to the orphanage and proceeds for forgiveness from Madhu & Latha. By the time, she learns all of them are leaving for abroad. Immediately, she rushes to the airport and embraces Madhu & children. At last, surprisingly, Latha affirms that she is exiting Madhu’s life, but not alone, carrying his child. Finally, the movie ends with Latha proceeding abroad and everyone gives her a warm sendoff.

Cast

 Jagapati Babu as Madhu
 Aamani as Radha
 Roja as Lata
 Kota Srinivasa Rao as Bangarayah
 Brahmanandam as A. V. S.'s son-in-law
 Ali as Raja
 Tanikella Bharani as Doctor
 A. V. S. as Madhu's house owner
 Subbaraya Sharma as Lata's father
 Gundu Hanumantha Rao as Compounder
 Ananth as Soundarya's PA
 Manto
 Nittala Sriramachandra Murthy
 Soundarya as Herself
 Suhasini as Meena
 Annapoorna as Radha's mother
 Sri Lakshmi as A. V. S.'s wife and daughter (Dual role)

Soundtrack

The music was composed by the director S. V. Krishna Reddy himself.

Accolades

Filmfare Awards
Best Director - S. V. Krishna Reddy  won
Best Actress - Aamani  won

Nandi Awards - 1994
Second Best Feature Film - Silver - K. Venkateswara Rao
Best Male Comedian - A. V. S. 
Best Lyricist - Sirivennela Sitaramasastri - "Chilaka Ye Todu Leka"

References

External links
 

Telugu films remade in other languages
1994 films
Indian romantic drama films
Films directed by S. V. Krishna Reddy
Films scored by S. V. Krishna Reddy
1990s Telugu-language films
Films about marriage
1994 romantic drama films